Begonia rex, the king begonia, is a species of flowering plant in the family Begoniaceae. It is found from Arunachal Pradesh to southeast China, and has been introduced to Bangladesh, Cuba, and Hispaniola. It is a parent to over 500 cultivars in the Begonia Rex Cultorum Group of houseplants. Other parents in the multitude of crosses made during the creation of the Group include Begonia annulata, B.cathayana, B.decora, B.diadema, B.dregei, B.grandis, B.hatacoa, B.palmata, and B.xanthina.

The following cultivars in the Begonia Rex Cultorum Group have gained the Royal Horticultural Society's Award of Garden Merit: 'Benitochiba', 'Carolina Moon', 'China Curl', 'Curly Fireflush', 'David Blais', 'Dewdrop', 'Emerald Beauty', 'Escargot', 'Fireworks', 'Green Gold', 'Helen Lewis', 'Hilo Holiday', 'Ironstone', 'Martin Johnson', 'Midnight Magic', 'Mikado', 'Namur', 'Orient', 'Pink Champagne', 'Princess of Hanover', 'Red Robin', 'Regal Minuet', 'Rocheart', 'Roi de Roses', 'Sal's Comet', 'Sea Serpent', 'Silver Cloud', 'Silver King', and 'Silver Queen'.

References

rex
House plants
Flora of Assam (region)
Flora of East Himalaya
Flora of Myanmar
Flora of South-Central China
Flora of Southeast China
Plants described in 1857